The Force Behind the Power is the nineteenth studio album by American singer Diana Ross, released on September 10, 1991 by Motown Records.   The album reached No. 11 on the UK Albums chart.

Singles
The album spun off five hit singles in the UK - most successfully "When You Tell Me That You Love Me" which reached No. 2 on the UK Singles chart (and No. 26 on the Billboard Adult Contemporary Songs chart), earning a BPI Silver disc for UK sales of over 200,000 copies. "One Shining Moment" and the album's Stevie Wonder-produced title track reached Numbers 10 and 27 on the UK Singles chart respectively.

If We Hold on Together reached No. 11 on the UK Singles chart and No. 23 on the Billboard Adult Contemporary Songs chart, while a cover of Barbra Streisand's "Heart (Don't Change My Mind)" reached No. 31 on the UK Singles chart.

"No Matter What You Do" - her duet with Al B. Sure! - was a major US R&B hit where it peaked at number 4 on the Hot R&B/Hip Hop Songs chart, while "You're Gonna Love It" written by Cydney Davis and Lloyd Tolbert was also released as a US single, where it rose to No. 24 on the US Dance Club Songs chart.

"If We Hold on Together" was originally recorded for Don Bluth's 1988 animated adventure film The Land Before Time. It rose to prominence after it was released as a single worldwide in the latter part of 1988 (most prominently in Japan in 1990, after it was used as the theme song for the TBS drama Omoide ni Kawaru Made). It reached #1 on the Japanese International single charts for 12 contiguous weeks making it the biggest selling record by a foreign artist; and in total, sold over 465,000 copies.

Commercial reception
In the UK the album certified platinum for sales exceeding 300,000 copies. It also went Gold in Japan and various European territories. The album was successful enough internationally that Ross' "Here and Now" World Tour lasted nearly two years.

Track listings

US edition
"Change of Heart" (Terry Britten, Graham Lyle) – 4:02 
"When You Tell Me That You Love Me" (John Bettis, Albert Hammond) – 4:13 
"Battlefield" (Paul Carrack, Nick Lowe) – 3:35 
"Blame It on the Sun" (Stevie Wonder, Syreeta Wright) – 3:55 
"Heavy Weather" (Michael Sembello) – 4:59 
"The Force Behind the Power" (Stevie Wonder) – 4:45 
"Heart (Don't Change My Mind)" (Robbie Buchanan, Diane Warren) – 4:19 
"Waiting in the Wings" (Andy Hill, Pete Sinfield) – 4:52 
"One Shining Moment" (Vaneese Thomas) – 4:48 
"You're Gonna Love It" (Cydney Davis, Lloyd Tolbert) – 5:11 
"If We Hold on Together" (James Horner, Barry Mann, Will Jennings) – 4:09

International edition
"Change of Heart" (Britten, Lyle) – 4:03 
"When You Tell Me That You Love Me" (Bettis, Hammond) – 4:13 
"Battlefield" (Carrack, Lowe) – 3:35  
"Blame It on the Sun" (Wonder, Wright) – 3:55 
"You're Gonna Love It" (Davis, Tolbert) – 5:11  
"Heavy Weather" (Sembello) – 4:59  
"The Force Behind the Power" (Wonder) – 4:42  
"Heart (Don't Change My Mind)" (Buchanan, Warren) – 4:19  
"Waiting in the Wings" (Hill, Sinfield) – 4:52  
"You and I" (Dormer, Goldo, Vigil) – 4:09 
"One Shining Moment" (Thomas) – 4:48  
"If We Hold on Together" (James Horner, Barry Mann, Will Jennings) – 4:13 
"No Matter What You Do" (duet with Al B. Sure!) (Brown, West) – 5:09

Personnel 

 Diana Ross – lead vocals
 John Barnes – keyboards (1, 5, 9), synthesizers (1, 5, 6, 9), synthesizer programming (1, 5, 6, 9), Synclavier (1, 5, 6, 9), Synclavier programming and arrangements (1, 5, 6, 9)
 Llyod Tolbert – keyboards (1, 5, 9), synthesizer programming (1, 5, 6, 9), arrangements (1, 5, 9)
 Kevin Perry – additional programming (1, 5, 6, 9)
 Andrew Scheps – additional programming (1, 5, 6, 9)
 Robbie Buchanan – keyboards (2-4, 8, 9)
 Andrew Gold – organ (3), acoustic guitar (3)
 James Anthony Carmichael – arrangements (1, 5, 6, 9), keyboards (6), synthesizers (6)
 Stevie Wonder – all instruments (6), arrangements (6), choir arrangement (6)
 Rob Arbittier – programming (7)
 Atle Bakken – programming (7)
 Malcolm Cecil – programming (7)
 Randy Kerber – keyboards (12)
 Guy Moon – keyboards (12)
 Carlos Rios – guitars (1, 5, 6, 9)
 Michael Landau – guitars (2-4, 8, 11)
 Waddy Wachtel – guitars (12)
 Freddie Washington – bass (2-4, 8)
 Larry Klein – bass (11)
 Leland Sklar – bass (12)
 Carlos Vega – drums (2-4, 8, 9)
 Russ Kunkel – drums (12)
 Michael Fisher – percussion (2-4, 8, 9, 11), vibraphone (3)
 Nathaniel Kunkel – percussion (9)
 Warren Ham – harmonica (3, 6)
 John Helliwell – saxophone (8)
 David Campbell – BGV arrangements, orchestra arrangements and conductor (2-4, 8, 11, 12)
 Gavyn Wright – orchestra leader (2-4, 8, 11, 12)
 Isobel Griffiths – orchestra contractor (2-4, 8, 11, 12)
 Marva King – backing vocals (1, 5, 6, 9)
 Arnold McCuller – backing vocals (1, 5, 6, 9)
 Deborah Thomas – backing vocals (1, 5, 6, 9)
 Fred White – backing vocals (1, 5, 6, 9)
 Peter Asher – backing vocals (2), tambourine (3), drum and percussion programming (11)
 Valerie Carter – backing vocals (2-4, 8, 11, 12)
 Kate Markowitz – backing vocals (2-4, 8, 11, 12)
 Cydney Davis – backing vocals (5)
 The Andraé Crouch Singers – choir (7)

Production 
 Executive producer – Diana Ross
 Producers – James Anthony Carmichael (tracks 1, 5, 6 & 9); Peter Asher (tracks 2–4, 8 & 10–13); Stevie Wonder (track 6).
 Co-producer on track 7 – Nathan Watts 
 Co-producer on track 5 – Lloyd Tolbert
 A&R direction – Debbie Sandridge
 Album coordinator – Marylata E. Jacob
 Engineers – Calvin Harris and Jack Rouben (tracks 1, 5, 6 & 9); Frank Wolf (tracks 2–4, 8, 10–12); Steve Van Arden (track 7).
 Assistant engineers – Mark Hagen and Andrew Scheps (tracks 1, 5, 6 & 9); Bryant Arnett, Darren Godwin, Mike Harlow, Nathaniel Kunkel Ken Lauber and Gil Morales (tracks 2–4, 8, 10–12); Jimmy Sandweiss (track 7).
 Recorded at Bill Schnee Studio, Studio F, Wonderland Studios, Westlake Audio, Off Meleose Recording Studio and The Complex (Los Angeles, CA); Cal Harris Studios (Woodland Hills, CA); The Sandbox (Easton, CT); Abbey Road Studios (London, England).
 Digital editing on track 7 – R.R. Harlan
 Mixing – Calvin Harris (tracks 1, 5, 6 & 9); Frank Wolf (tracks 2–4, 8, 10–12); Steve Van Arden (track 7).
 Mixed at Conway Studios (Hollywood, CA), The Complex, Cal Harris Studios and Wonderland Studios.
 Mastered by Chris Bellman at Bernie Grundman Mastering (Hollywood, CA).
 Art direction – Dennis Woloch
 Design concept – Diana Ross
 Painting – Barry Kamen
 Photography – Herb Ritts
 Assistant to Diana Ross – Judith Service

Charts

Certifications

References

1991 albums
Motown albums
Diana Ross albums
Albums produced by Peter Asher
albums produced by James Anthony Carmichael
New jack swing albums